John R. Cash is the 51st overall album by country singer Johnny Cash, released in 1975 on Columbia Records. It consists mostly of covers of other musicians' songs. The first track on the album, a song titled "My Old Kentucky Home", is not the state song of Kentucky, but a composition by Randy Newman which had been previously recorded by the Osborne Brothers in 1970 and Three Dog Night in 1972; Cash's version, like that of the Osborne Brothers five years previous, was released as the second single from the album, though the previously issued single "The Lady Came from Baltimore" had achieved greater success on the charts, reaching #14. The Cash original "Lonesome to the Bone" had previously appeared on Ragged Old Flag (1974) and would make one more appearance on Silver (1979).

Cash himself disliked John R. Cash, criticizing both the album and its production process in his 1997 autobiography, Cash: The Autobiography. He claimed the release was "[the CBS bosses'] idea of an album to restore [Cash's] sales potential", mentioning that the instrumental tracks were recorded separately from the vocals, a standard practice Cash didn't usually follow himself. In addition, this was the first Johnny Cash album on which his regular backing group, The Tennessee Three did not participate; instead, producer Gary Klein recruited a number of session musicians including members of Elvis Presley's TCB Band concert backing group, including guitarist James Burton, pianist Larry Muhoberac and drummer Ron Tutt.

Track listing

Personnel
Johnny Cash – vocals, guitar
Marshall Grant – bass
Bob Wootton – guitar
Reggie Young – guitar
Henry Strzelecki – bass guitar
Kenny Malone – drums
Shane Keister, Teddy Irwin – keyboards
David Allan Coe – harmony vocals
Jackie Ward, The Ron Hicklin Singers – backing vocals
Harry Bluestone – strings concertmaster
Frank DeCaro – contractor
Ron Tutt, Reini Press, David Foster, Larry Muhoberac, Ron Elliot, Ry Cooder, James Burton, Russ Thelman, Jerry Cole, Victor Feldman, Joe Porcaro, Gene Estes, Nick DeCaro, Gene Cipriano – musicians in Los Angeles

Additional personnel
Produced by Gary Klein
Arranged by Nick DeCaro
Mixed by Al Schmitt
Cover design: Bill Barnes and Julie Holiner
Cover photo: Al Clayton
Flyleaf photo: Emerson-Loew

Charts
Singles – Billboard (United States)

External links
Luma Electronic entry on John R. Cash

John R. Cash
John R. Cash
Albums produced by Gary Klein (producer)
John R. Cash